Sadhana Singh is an Indian politician and a member of 17th Legislative Assembly, Uttar Pradesh of India. She represents the Mughalsarai constituency in Chandauli district of Uttar Pradesh.

Political career
Sadhana Singh contested Uttar Pradesh Assembly Election as Bharatiya Janata Party candidate and defeated her close contestant Babulal from Samajwadi Party with a margin of 13,243 votes.

She started her political career from BJP in 1993, after that she worked on many posts within the party. She became President of BJP Mahila Morcha Chandauli twice. She also became Member of BJP UP Working Committee thrice.

She was MLA from Mughalsarai (Deendayal Upadhyay Nagar) Chandauli. She is also the president of Jila Udyog Vyapar Mandal Chandauli Uttar Pradesh.

Posts held

See also
Uttar Pradesh Legislative Assembly

References

Uttar Pradesh MLAs 2017–2022
Living people
Year of birth missing (living people)